Katedralskola (Swedish; "Cathedral School") is the name, or part of the name, of several Swedish language schools in Sweden and Finland, each of which traces its origin to a medieval cathedral school or a 17th-century gymnasium near a cathedral:

Katedralskolan, in Linköping, Sweden
Katedralskolan, in Lund, Sweden
Katedralskolan, in Skara, Sweden
Katedralskolan, in Uppsala, Sweden
Katedralskolan, in Växjö, Sweden
Katedralskolan, in Åbo (Finnish: Turku), Finland

sv:Katedralskolan